Rebild municipality is a municipality (Danish, kommune) in North Jutland Region in Denmark. It covers an area of 628 km² and has a total population of 30,646 (2022).

On 1 January 2007 Rebild municipality was created as the result of Kommunalreformen ("The Municipal Reform" of 2007), consisting of the former municipalities of Nørager, Skørping and Støvring.

Danes and descendants of emigrants have celebrated the U.S. Independence Day with barbecues, square dancing and country music outside Rebild, a village 155 miles northwest of Copenhagen.  The land that today comprises Rebild National Park, south of Aalborg, was bought by Americans of Danish descent and donated to the people and nation of Denmark with a single codicil- that July 4 be celebrated there every year. There are speeches and fireworks and parades, attended by Americans and Danes. It is a pretty amusing approximation of US celebrations.

There is also a small museum called The Lincoln Blokhuset (Log Cabin) that is far grander than anything Abraham Lincoln lived in until he was elected president.

Locations

Politics

Municipal council
Rebild's municipal council consists of 25 members, elected every four years.

Below are the municipal councils elected since the Municipal Reform of 2007.

See also 
 Ravnkilde
 Rebild Festival

References 

 Municipal statistics: NetBorger Kommunefakta, delivered from KMD aka Kommunedata (Municipal Data)
 Municipal mergers and neighbors: Eniro new municipalities map
 4 July:

External links 

  

 
Municipalities of the North Jutland Region
Municipalities of Denmark
Populated places established in 2007